Paulina Gramaglia (born 21 March 2003) is an Argentine professional footballer who plays as a forward for American NWSL club Houston Dash, on loan from Primera División A side UAI Urquiza, and for the Argentina women's national team.

Club career
Gramaglia has played for Talleres de Córdoba and UAI Urquiza in Argentina. She joined and started playing for the latter in early December 2020. On 20 December 2021, she was announced as a new player of Houston Dash in the United States for the 2022 season, loaned by UAI Urquiza.

International career
Gramaglia has captained Argentina at under-17 level. She made her senior debut on 27 November 2021.

References

External links

2003 births
Living people
Footballers from Córdoba, Argentina
Argentine women's footballers
Women's association football forwards
Talleres de Córdoba footballers
UAI Urquiza (women) players
Houston Dash players
Argentina women's youth international footballers
Argentina women's international footballers
Argentine expatriate women's footballers
Argentine expatriate sportspeople in the United States
Expatriate women's soccer players in the United States
National Women's Soccer League players